8300 series may refer to:

 Hankyu 8300 series
 Nankai 8300 series